Jamie Peter Smith (born 16 September 1989 in Leytonstone) is an English professional footballer who most recently played for Harlow Town.

Career
Smith played for Walthamstow youth team Interwood. His former coach at Interwood, Trevor Bailey, brought him to Crystal Palace at the age of nine.

Smith progressed through the youth ranks at Crystal Palace and was awarded a one-year contract in the summer of 2008. After failing to make an appearance for Crystal Palace, Smith was released from the club in the summer of 2009. His former coach at Palace, Gary Issott, said; "Jamie Smith is a diminutive attacking central midfielder in the mould of Eyal Berkovic. He is very clever and improved after a frustrating first year. He started this season well and, up until Christmas, his form was electric."

On 3 August 2009, Smith signed a one-year contract with Brighton & Hove Albion after impressing during a trial with the club. Smith made his professional debut for Brighton during the 7–1 defeat to Huddersfield Town on 18 August 2009. He was substituted in the first half after goalkeeper Michel Kuipers was sent off; Smith made way for the replacement goalkeeper Graeme Smith.

Smith signed a six-month contract extension in May 2011
After being released by the Seagulls, Smith went on to train and eventually sign a contract until the end of the 2011–12 season with Leyton Orient. He made his only Orient appearance as a late substitute in the 3–0 defeat at Exeter City on 9 April 2012. On 15 May he was one of three players released by Orient manager Russell Slade.

Following a brief period at Dover Athletic, Smith joined Eastbourne Borough in November 2012.

Honours

Brighton & Hove Albion
Football League One: 2010–11

References

External links
Profile on Holmesdale.net
Soccerbase Information

1989 births
English footballers
Living people
Crystal Palace F.C. players
Brighton & Hove Albion F.C. players
Leyton Orient F.C. players
Dover Athletic F.C. players
Eastbourne Borough F.C. players
English Football League players
Harlow Town F.C. players
Association football midfielders